The deputy premier of Western Australia is a role in the Government of Western Australia assigned to a responsible Minister in the Australian state of Western Australia. It has second ranking behind the premier of Western Australia in Cabinet, and its holder serves as acting premier during absence or incapacity of the premier. The role was only formally established on 7 December 1955, but had existed in practice since the earliest days of responsible government.

List of deputy premiers of Western Australia
 Political parties

References
 Deputy Premiers of Western Australia Parliament of Western Australia

Western Australia
 
Western Australia-related lists